Simhallsbadet is a swimming complex in Malmö city, Sweden owned by the Malmö Municipality. It was known as Aq-va-kul 1988–2015. Today it is mainly used by swimming clubs and schools.

History

Simhallsbadet (1956–1988) 
Simhallsbadet was built as a public swimming venue in 1956 with a 25 m pool, and in 1977 a 50 m pool was added.

Aq-va-kul (1988–2015) 
In 1988 a water park was built and the facility's name changed to Aq-va-kul. There was also a Turkish bath and a relaxation area. The facility had 600,000 visitors yearly. The name Aq-va-kul is a word play on the Latin word for water, aqua, and the Swedish phrase Ack, vad kul (English: "Oh!, how fun").

Aq-va-kul was the arena for seven Swedish Short Course Swimming Championships (until 2003), four Swedish Junior's Swimming Championships (until 2002), four Swedish Youth Short Course Swimming Championships finals (until 2006), and several meets in the FINA Swimming World Cup series in the 1990s. The current European record for men's 800 m freestyle was set in the 25 m pool in January 1997 by German Jörg Hoffman, with a time of 7:36.24.

Simhallsbadet (2015 –) 
In 2015 Hylliebadet replaced Aq-va-kul as a public swimming venue. At the same time Aq-va-kul changed name to the former Simhallsbadet and is now mainly used by swimming clubs and schools.

References

External links
 Simhallsbadet (former Aq-va-kul)
 Hylliebadet

Buildings and structures in Malmö
Swimming venues in Sweden
Sport in Malmö
20th-century establishments in Skåne County